Simon Clarke (born 18 July 1986) is an Australian professional road racing cyclist, who currently rides for UCI WorldTeam . Before turning professional, Clarke competed in track cycling as an Australian Institute of Sport scholarship holder. He is not related to fellow Australian cyclist and past teammate Will Clarke.

Professional career
At the 2012 Vuelta a España, Clarke won the fourth stage of the race, after being a part of an early breakaway that made it home on the mountainous race. The only other survivor of the break was 's Tony Martin, whom Clarke out sprinted to claim his first professional victory. During the twentieth stage, Clarke placed first at the first three of five categorised climbs, to win the most combative rider for the stage and to secure himself the blue polka-dot jersey, as winner of the mountains classification.

In September 2015, it was announced that Clarke would join  for the 2016 season. He was added to Australia's roster for the 2016 Summer Olympics, replacing Simon Gerrans, who had crashed out of the Tour de France.

In November 2020, it was announced that Clarke would join the  team for the 2021 season. Clarke won the fifth stage of the 2022 Tour de France. He joined the winning breakaway group on a stage that included eleven sections of cobbles, many of which were unfamiliar sections that had never been used in the Tour or Paris–Roubaix. As the third week began he was forced to quit the Tour for the first time in his career, due to a positive COVID test.

Major results

2004
 1st  Team pursuit, UCI Junior Track World Championships
2005
 5th Gran Premio Industrie del Marmo
 8th Melbourne to Warrnambool Classic
 10th Overall Giro delle Regioni
2006
 1st  Madison, National Junior Track Championships
 4th Overall Giro delle Regioni
 5th Trofeo Città di Brescia
 7th Overall Vuelta a Navarra
1st Stage 4
 8th Overall Herald Sun Tour
 8th Overall Tour Down Under
 9th Overall Thüringen Rundfahrt der U23
2007
 2nd Gran Premio Palio del Recioto
 3rd Road race, National Under-23 Road Championships
 3rd Down Under Classic
 3rd GP Liberazione
 6th Overall Tour of Britain
 7th Overall Herald Sun Tour
1st  Young rider classification
 7th Overall Circuito Montañés
 8th Giro del Mendrisiotto
 8th GP Capodarco
 10th Overall Tour Down Under
1st  Young rider classification
2008
 1st  Road race, National Under-23 Road Championships
 1st Trofeo Città di San Vendemiano
 1st Stage 4 Tour of Japan
 2nd GP Capodarco
 2nd La Côte Picarde
 2nd Trofeo Alcide Degasperi
 4th Ronde Van Vlaanderen Beloften
 6th Overall Tour of Ireland
 7th Trofeo Città di Castelfidardo
2009
 8th Overall Tour of Britain
 8th Gran Premio dell'Insubria-Lugano
 8th Trofeo Laigueglia
 10th Memorial Cimurri
2010
 4th GP Industria & Artigianato di Larciano
2011
 5th Coppa Ugo Agostoni
 5th Tre Valli Varesine
 7th Giro del Friuli
 7th Vattenfall Cyclassics
 10th Grand Prix Cycliste de Québec
2012
 Vuelta a España
1st  Mountains classification
1st Stage 4
 2nd Overall Tour of Norway
 2nd Rogaland GP
 5th Overall Tour du Haut Var
 7th Japan Cup
2013
 1st Stage 4 (TTT) Tour de France
 7th Road race, UCI Road World Championships
2014
 1st  Overall Herald Sun Tour
1st Stage 2
 4th Gran Premio Città di Camaiore
2015
 Giro d'Italia
1st Stage 1 (TTT)
Held  after Stage 4
 2nd Cadel Evans Great Ocean Road Race
 4th Overall Herald Sun Tour
 10th International Road Cycling Challenge
 10th Prueba Villafranca de Ordizia
2016
 1st GP Industria & Artigianato di Larciano
2017
 6th GP Industria & Artigianato di Larciano
2018
 1st Stage 5 Vuelta a España
 8th Overall Vuelta a Andalucía
2019
 2nd Overall Tour de la Provence
1st  Points classification
 2nd Amstel Gold Race
 8th Overall Tirreno–Adriatico
 8th Strade Bianche
 9th Overall BinckBank Tour
 9th Milan–San Remo
2020
 1st La Drôme Classic
2021
 5th Royal Bernard Drôme Classic
 5th Primus Classic
 8th Strade Bianche
2022
 1st Stage 5 Tour de France
 3rd GP Miguel Induráin
 3rd Trofeo Serra de Tramuntana
 5th Trofeo Calvià
 6th Trofeo Pollença – Port d'Andratx
2023
 2nd Road race, National Road Championships
 2nd Vuelta a Murcia
 3rd Cadel Evans Great Ocean Road Race
 8th La Drôme Classic

Grand Tour general classification results timeline

References

External links

 
 
 
 
 
 
 

1986 births
Australian Institute of Sport cyclists
Australian Tour de France stage winners
Australian Vuelta a España stage winners
Australian male cyclists
Commonwealth Games competitors for Australia
Cyclists at the 2014 Commonwealth Games
Cyclists at the 2016 Summer Olympics
Cyclists from Melbourne
Living people
Olympic cyclists of Australia
Sportsmen from Victoria (Australia)